The Riva Aquarama is a luxury wooden runabout built by Italian yachtbuilder Riva. Production of it and its derivatives (the Lungo, Super, and Special) ran from 1962 until 1996. The hull was based on the Riva Tritone, an earlier model speedboat by Riva, which in turn was inspired by the American mahogany Chris-Craft runabouts. The boat's speed, beauty, and craftsmanship earned it praise as the Ferrari of the boat world. The company was founded by Pietro Riva in 1842, and run by Carlo Riva through its 1969 sale to the American Whittaker Corporation.

Description 

The most famous of Carlo Riva’s designs, the Aquarama has become over the decades a nautical legend.  Its evocative name, derived in part from the widescreen Cinerama movie format popular in the early 1960s, echoed in its sweeping wrap-around windshield, conjures images from another time.

The Riva Aquarama's 8.02 - 8.78 metre hull was sheathed in mahogany and varnished to accentuate the beauty of its natural wood grain. All versions were twin engined, with top speeds of 45/50 knots depending on engine choice. Power varied from 185 hp to 400 hp per engine, delivered by Riva 'tuned' Cadillac and Chrysler models, among others. On top of the engine compartment was a cushioned sundeck. The boats also carried a convertible roof which retracted behind the rear seat and cockpit. A swim ladder was often mounted in the stern.

Model variants: 1960s and 1970s
 Aquarama (1962–1972) Total built 281
 Aquarama Lungo (1972) Total built 7
 Super Aquarama (1963–1971) Total built 203
 Aquarama Special (1972–1996) Total built 277
 Riva Lamborghini (1968) - one-off, powered by two Lamborghini V12 engines 

The Aquarama is a direct descendant of the Tritone, upon whose hull it was based. First built in 1962, it incorporated the open sunbathing area of the Tritone Aperto together with new features, including separate front seats and a central non-slip gangway which allowed easier water access at the stern.

Legacy
Jeremy Clarkson looked at the history of the Aquarama in his TV programme Jeremy Clarkson's Extreme Machines, and later mentioned it in his book I Know You Got Soul. The boat also featured in the Top Gear 2013 DVD special The Perfect Road Trip in which presenter Jeremy Clarkson, whilst piloting the boat in Venice, described it as "the most beautiful thing ever made". The actress Charlize Theron piloted an Aquarama Super in 1993 in a spot for Martini & Rossi. Another Special piloted by Xenia Onatopp appears in the movie GoldenEye, and a Special is piloted by Vincent Cassel in the movie Ocean's Twelve. In 2011 the actor Jude Law piloted an Aquarama Special for the Dior 2011 campaign.

Monte Carlo Offshorer

After selling the Riva yard, Carlo Riva took part in the creation of the "Monte Carlo Offshorer" brand. 

The goal was to develop runabouts with the same strengths as the Super Aquarama in build quality, power and livability on board while handling better at sea.

Riva Aquariva

Aquariva continues the Aquarama heritage into the 2000s.

References

External links
 
 Restoration of RIVA Tritone #156

Ferretti Group
Boats
Vehicles introduced in 1962